Kathryn "Kate" Burridge  is a prominent Australian linguist specialising in the Germanic languages. Burridge currently occupies the Chair of Linguistics in the School of Languages, Literatures, Cultures and Linguistics at Monash University.

Burridge's work has mainly focused on Pennsylvania Dutch-speaking communities in Canada, grammatical change in Germanic languages, the nature of euphemism and dysphemism, linguistic taboo, and on English grammatical structure in general. She is currently co-editor of the Australian Journal of Linguistics.

Burridge is a regular presenter of language segments on ABC Radio. She appeared weekly as a panellist on ABC TV's Can We Help?, and has also appeared on The Einstein Factor.

She was elected a Fellow of the Australian Academy of the Humanities in 1998 and Fellow of the Academy of the Social Sciences in Australia in 2020.

Bibliography

Monographs 
 
 "Euphemism and Dysphemism: Language Used as Shield and Weapon" (1991, Oxford University Press) - co-authored with Keith Allan.
"Diachronic Studies on the Languages of the Anabaptists" (1992, Universittsverlag Brockmeyer) - co-edited with Werner Enninger.
"Syntactic Change in Germanic" (1993, John Benjamins).
"Canada – Australia: Towards a Centenary of Partnership" (1997, Carlton Uni Press) - co-edited with Lois Foster and Gerry Turcotte.
"English in Australia and New Zealand - An Introduction to its Structure, History and Use" (1998, Oxford University Press) - co-authored with Jean Mulder.
"Introducing English Grammar" (2000, Edward Arnold) - co-authored with Kersti Börjars.
"Blooming English: Observations on the roots, cultivation and hybrids of the English Language" (2004, Cambridge University Press; published 2002 by ABC Books).
"Weeds in the Garden of Words: further observations on the tangled history of the English language" (2005, Cambridge University Press; published 2004 by ABC Books).
"Forbidden Words: Taboo and the Censoring of Language" (2006, Cambridge: Cambridge University Press) - co-authored with Keith Allan.

Book reviews

References

External links 
Monash University Staff Page

Year of birth missing (living people)
Living people
Academics of the University of Westminster
Alumni of the University of London
Australian Book Review people
Australian non-fiction writers
Fellows of the Academy of the Social Sciences in Australia
Fellows of the Australian Academy of the Humanities
Academic staff of La Trobe University
Linguists from Australia
Linguists from Germany
Academic staff of Monash University
Sociolinguists
University of Western Australia alumni
Women linguists